Rahul Shankar Bheke (born 6 December 1990) is an Indian professional footballer who plays as a defender for Indian Super League club Mumbai City and the India national team.

Club career

Early career and Air India
Born in Mumbai, Maharashtra, Bheke started to play football for his school teams before joining the under-19 squad of Mahindra United. Bheke then joined his first professional club, Air India, and played for them from 2011 to 2013. After Air India were expelled from the I-League, Bheke joined Mumbai Tigers. He played for them in small cup competitions before leaving the club.

Mumbai
In January 2014, Bheke returned to the I-League after he signed for Mumbai. He made his debut for the club on 15 January against Mohun Bagan in the Federation Cup. He came on as a substitute for Pappachen Pradeep as Mumbai lost 1–0. He went on to make eight appearances for the club that season and was signed a contract extension which will keep him till next season.

Bheke scored his first professional goal on 7 April 2015 against Bengaluru at the Sree Kanteerava Stadium. His 67th-minute goal put Mumbai in the lead but Robin Singh managed to equalize two minutes before stoppage time to end the game 1–1.

East Bengal
After two seasons with Mumbai, Bheke signed for fellow I-League side, East Bengal. Bheke played his first debut match on 23 January 2016 against arch-rival Mohun Bagan which finished in a 1–1 draw. He played his last match of the season on 10 April in a 3–1 defeat against Bengaluru FC. Bheke left the club on loan for Kerala Blasters in the 2015 Indian Super League. After two loan stints, Bheke returned to East Bengal for the 2016-17 I-League season. Bheke played his first match of the season on 7 January 2017 in a 1–1 draw against Aizawl FC. Bheke played his last match with East Bengal against his former club Mumbai FC, which they came out winning on a big margin of 0–4.

Kerala Blasters (loan)
After a good performance for Mumbai during the 2014–15 I-League season, Bheke was one of the available players during the 2015 Indian Super League domestic draft. Unfortunately, Bheke was not chosen in the draft. However, in September 2015, it was revealed that Bheke had joined the Kerala Blasters for their pre-season camp and eventually he signed with the club on loan from East Bengal. Bheke made his debut for the club during their opening fixture against NorthEast United on 6 October 2015. He started and played 90 minutes as Kerala Blasters won 3–1. He played his last match on 18 October in a 0–1 defeat against Delhi Dynamos (present Odisha FC).

Pune City (loan)
Bheke was loaned to former Indian Super League side FC Pune City from East Bengal after his loan term with Kerala Blasters. He played his first match for the club against ATK on 6 November 2016 which they rose to win 2–1. Bheke lost his first match with Pune on 25 November against his former club Kerala Blasters, which they lost 2–1. He played his last match against ATK in the return leg at road which ended in a 0–0 draw.

Bengaluru
Bheke was picked by Bengaluru in Round 4 in 2017–18 ISL Players Draft. Bengaluru was one of the two new entries to Indian Super League. Bheke played his first match with Bengaluru in his continental debut in the 2017 AFC Cup against April 25 SC on 23 August 2017, which ended 3–0 to Bengaluru. Bheke played his first league match of the 2017-18 Indian Super League season on 19 November 2017 in their first ever match in ISL against Mumbai City FC, which ended 2–0 to Bengaluru. Bengaluru had a perfect debut campaign, as they qualified for the finals of the 2017-18 Indian Super League season with Bheke on team after defeating his former club FC Pune City on an aggregate score of 3–1. Bheke started in the final against Chennaiyin FC but was defeated on a score of 2–3. Bheke played his first match of the 2018 AFC Cup on 13 February 2018 against T.C. Sports Club, which turned out in a 2–3 victory for Bengaluru. On 22 February 2018, Bengaluru extended his contract for three years which will keep him at the club till 2021. Bheke played his first match 2018-19 Indian Super League season on 30 September against the defending champions Chennaiyin, which ended 1-0 to Bengaluru. Bengaluru had a standout campaign, as they qualified for the finals yet again in that season against FC Goa. The match went on deadlock for both sides but the victory was sealed for Bengaluru when Bheke scored the deciding goal in the 117th minute to win the first Indian Super League trophy for Bengaluru. Bheke was named man of the match on the final eve for his solitary goal in the 117 minute. Bheke played his first match of the 2019-20 Indian Super League season against NorthEast United FC on 21 October 2019, which ended in a 0–0 draw. He scored his first goal of the season on 22 January 2020 in a 3–0 victory over Odisha. Bengaluru qualified for the knockout stage for the third consecutive time the season with Bheke on side but was defeated by ATK on an aggregate score of 3–2. Bheke started in his first match of the 2020 AFC Cup qualifying play-offs against Maziya on the second leg of the qualifying round, which Bengaluru won 3–2 but lost on penalties after the after aggregate score of 4–4 led to the shoot-out. Bheke played his first match of the 2020-21 Indian Super League season against FC Goa on 22 November 2020 in a 2–2 draw. He scored his first goal of the season against NorthEast United on 12 January 2021, which ended in a 1–1 draw due to the equalizer scored by Bheke. After the 2020-21 ISL campaign, Bheke left Bengaluru after spending four seasons at the club.

Mumbai City
On 19 August 2021, Bheke joined Mumbai City on a two-year deal with an option to extend for a further season.

On 22 November, Bheke made his debut for the club in the Indian Super League against Goa, in a resounding 3–0 win. He scored his first and the winning goal against Chennaiyin, on 15 December in a 1–0 win. On 17 February, he scored his second goal of the season, against Jamshedpur in a 3–2 defeat.

He was later included in the club's 2022 AFC Champions League squad. On 11 April, he scored the winning header from a corner in the 75th minute, in a historic 2–1 win against Al-Quwa Al-Jawiya, as Mumbai City became the first Indian club to win an AFC Champions League game. He in turn became the first Indian player to score in the competition.

International career
Bheke got his call-up for the senior national team under the head coach Igor Štimac after his excellent performance in the 2018-19 Indian Super League season along with five other rookies. Bheke made his international debut against Curaçao in 2019 King's Cup on 5 June 2019 which turned out to be a 3–1 loss to India. After the King's Cup, Bheke was called up for the Indian squad to take part in the 2022 FIFA World Cup qualifiers. He played his first of the qualifiers on 5 September 2019 against Oman, which India lost 1–2. He also played in India's match against Qatar on 10 September, where India put on an excellent show, as they drew against the continental champions 0–0. Bheke also appeared in the second qualifying match against Qatar on 3 June 2021, where he was booked twice, resulting in a red card in the early 17th minute of the game. India ended up losing the match 0–1 at full-time. He scored his first international goal against Bahrain on 23 March 2022 in their 2–1 defeat.

Personal life 
He married his longtime sweetheart Shraddha Waingankar in 2019.

Career statistics

Club

International

International goals

Honours

Club 
East Bengal
Calcutta Football League: 2015–16, 2016–17
Bengaluru FC
Indian Super Cup: 2018
Indian Super League: 2018–19
Mumbai City
ISL League Winners Shield: 2022–23

International
India
 SAFF Championship: 2021
 King's Cup third place: 2019

References

External links 
 
 Rahul Bheke at All India Football Federation
 Rahul Bheke at Indian Super League

1990 births
Living people
Footballers from Mumbai
Footballers from Maharashtra
Indian footballers
Air India FC players
Mumbai Tigers FC players
Mumbai FC players
East Bengal Club players
Kerala Blasters FC players
FC Pune City players
Bengaluru FC players
Association football defenders
I-League players
Indian Super League players
India international footballers
Mumbai City FC players
Calcutta Football League players